Ken Smollen (born ) is an Irish politician. He was one of the founding members of the Irish Democratic Party (IDP), but left in 2020. Smollen currently sits on Offaly County Council, having been elected for the Tullamore electoral area in 2019.

From Tullamore, Smollen resides in Clara, County Offaly. He is a former sergeant in the Garda Síochána, having served for more than three decades. As of 2018, the Ken Smollen Food Appeal was giving out food package to families each month.

Smollen ran as a candidate for the Irish Democratic Party in the new Offaly constituency at the 2016 Irish general election.

At the 2019 Offaly County Council election, he ran in the Tullamore electoral area and won a seat.

He was a candidate for the Irish Democratic Party in the Laois–Offaly constituency at the 2020 Irish general election, gaining 3.76% of first preference votes, and was eliminated on the sixth count.
Smollen resigned from the IDP in October 2021, and was acting as an independent councillor as of 2021.

References

1960s births
Living people
Irish anti-poverty advocates
Garda Síochána officers
Local councillors in County Offaly
People from Tullamore, County Offaly
Independent politicians in Ireland